Maksim Vasilyevich Vintov (born 22 January 1985) is a former Russian professional football player.

Club career
He played one season in the Russian Football National League for FC Dynamo Makhachkala.

Personal life
His older brother Roman Vintov is also a footballer.

External links
 
 Career summary by sportbox.ru
 

1985 births
Living people
Russian footballers
Association football midfielders
FC Gornyak Uchaly players
FC Vityaz Podolsk players
FC Arsenal Tula players
FC Dynamo Makhachkala players